The Secret Life of Girls is a 1999 film directed and written by Holly Goldberg Sloan, and starring Majandra Delfino, Linda Hamilton, Eugene Levy, Meagan Good, Kate Vernon and Emily Osment in her film debut.

Premise
A teenager discovers how difficult growing up can be in 1973.

External links
 
 

1999 films
1999 comedy films
Films directed by Holly Goldberg Sloan
American comedy films
1990s English-language films
1990s American films